Killing Us Softly 4: Advertising’s Image of Women is an American documentary based on a lecture by Jean Kilbourne and is produced and distributed by the Media Education Foundation. The documentary, first released in 1979 and since revised and updated three times, focuses on images of women in advertising, in particular on gender stereotypes, the effects of advertising on women's self-image, and the objectification of women's bodies. 

The two most recent updates, Killing Us Softly 3 and Killing Us Softly 4, were produced by the Media Education Foundation and directed by Sut Jhally. Using modern print and television advertisements, the films make connections between unrealistic media portrayals of women and problems such as "eating disorders, men's violence against women, and the political backlash against feminism."

Overview
Kilbourne is critical of the advertising industry, accusing it of misconduct. She argues that the superficial, objectifying and unreal portrayal of women in advertising lowers women's self-esteem. Sexualized images of women are being used to sell virtually all kinds of goods, and Kilbourne argues that they degrade women, encourage abuse, and reinforce the patriarchal, sexist society. Kilbourne also draws a connection between advertising and pornography, stating that "the advertisers are America's real pornographers".

Versions
Killing Us Softly and its revisions have been developed from lectures that Kilbourne has been delivering at American universities since early 1970s. The documentary has had four editions, each updating the previous release:
 Killing Us Softly: Advertising's Image of Women (1979)
 Still Killing Us Softly: Advertising's Image of Women (1987), update of the 1979 film by Margaret Lazarus and Renner Wunderlich through Cambridge Documentary Films, with Jean Kilbourne as co-creator 
 Killing Us Softly 3 (1999), not to be confused with Beyond Killing Us Softly (2000), featuring Jean Kilbourne, directed by Sut Jhally, and produced by the Media Education Foundation. This update focuses on the same themes as previous versions, while also reviewing "if and how the image of women in advertising has changed over the last 20 years." 
 Killing Us Softly 4 (2010), featuring Jean Kilbourne, directed by Sut Jhally, and produced by the Media Education Foundation. This update uses contemporary print and television ads to examine how women are represented in the media, noting that "the more things have changed, the more they've stayed the same."

Reception
Killing Us Softly has often been used in university lectures, as well as by community organizers and feminist groups. Its various editions have been described as "extremely popular" and have attracted praise; Bakari Chavanu, for example, notes that the documentary is "an engaging and even humorous analysis of how images and ads shape our values". Ford, et al. noted that the documentary raises feminist consciousness, up to the point that it has been positively correlated with boycotts of products whose advertisements were seen as offensive.

The documentary has also evoked some negative reactions. Paul Rutherford criticized Kilbourne for a "crusade against advertising", arguing that in the documentary she is conflating pornography and erotica, not noticing the satirical and artistic values of advertising, and ignoring the influence of the world of fashion.

Related documentaries
Cambridge Documentary Films created two other films on this subject; the first is Beyond Killing Us Softly: The Strength to Resist (2000). That title was updated and released as The Strength to Resist: Advertising's Impact on Women and Girls, featuring Gloria Steinem, Amy Richards, Gail Dines, Valerie Batts, Jamila Batts, Catherine Steiner Adair, and others.

See also
 Effects of advertising on teen body image
 Exploitation of women in mass media
 Gender advertisement
 Miss Representation
 Sex in advertising
 Sexual objectification

References

Further reading
 
 
 
 Jean Kilbourne, Killing Us Softly: Gender Roles in Advertising, Adolesc Med. 1993 Oct;4(3):635-650.

External links
 IMDb links: Killing Us Softly 1, Still Killing Us Softly, Killing Us Softly 3, Killing Us Softly 4
 Killing Us Softly 4, short preview (4 min., 56 sec.) and full-length preview at MediaEd.org (45 min., 44 sec.)
 Kanopy previews: Killing Us Softly 1, Still Killing Us Softly, Killing Us Softly 3, Killing Us Softly 4

1979 documentary films
1987 documentary films
1999 documentary films
2000 documentary films
2010 documentary films
2010 films
American documentary films
Documentary film series
Documentary films about feminism
Documentary films about advertising
Documentary films about sexuality
Social impact of advertising
1990s English-language films
1980s English-language films
1970s English-language films